Guatteria chiriquensis is a tree species belonging to the Annonaceae family. It ranges from the central and southern Pacific slopes of Costa Rica to western Panama.

References

chiriquiensis
Flora of Costa Rica
Flora of Honduras
Flora of Nicaragua
Flora of Panama